Tim Gilbert may refer to:
 Tim Gilbert (footballer), English footballer
 Tim Gilbert (journalist), Australian journalist and radio and TV personality

See also
 Timothy Gilbert, American piano manufacturer, abolitionist and religious organizer